The  is a train service operated by Kyushu Railway Company (JR Kyushu) on the Kyushu Shinkansen in Japan since 2004.

The word  in Japanese means "swallow", and has been used on a succession of limited express trains on the Tokaido and Sanyo Main Line in Japan since 1930.

History

Pre-war
These services operated until 30 September 1943.

Post-war
These services continued until 9 March 1975 (when the San'yō Shinkansen was fully in operation).

JR Kyushu
The Tsubame name was once again revived by JR Kyushu from 15 July 1992 for limited express services operating on the Kagoshima Main Line between / and Nishi-Kagoshima (now Kagoshima-Chūō Station), operated using new 787 series EMUs in 6-, 7-, or 11-car formations.
These services operated until 12 March 2004, the day before the new Kyushu Shinkansen opened.

Relay Tsubame

The operation of the Relay Tsubame service was unique, as it was the only station in Japan where normal trains stopped at platforms adjacent to the shinkansen platforms. This was to facilitate transfer of passengers from shinkansen to Relay Tsubame and vice versa. Normally, shinkansen platforms are physically separated from normal train platforms with fare gates and may be at a different level (usually above the normal train platforms).

Services operate twice per hour in each direction during the morning and evening, and once per hour during the middle of the day. Some Tsubame services also run to/from Kagoshima-Chūō.

Rolling stock
Shinkansen train services are formed of eight-car N700 series (JR West N700-7000 series and JR Kyushu N700-8000 series) trains or six-car JR Kyushu 800 series trains.

Formations

N700 series
Eight-car N700 series services are formed as follows, with car 1 at the Kagoshima-Chūō (southern) end. Cars 1 to 3 are ordinary-class cars with 2+3 seating, and cars 4 to 8 are ordinary-class cars with 2+2 seating. Half of car 6 has "Green car" (first class) 2+2 seating. All cars are no-smoking except for smoking compartments in cars 3 and 7.

On some train services, cars 4 and 5 are also non-reserved.

800 series
Six-car 800 series services are formed as follows, with car 1 at the Kagoshima-Chūō (southern) end. All accommodation is ordinary class with 2+2 seating. All cars are no-smoking.

On some train services, car 4 is also non-reserved.

References

External links

 JR Kyushu Tsubame information

Railway services introduced in 1930
Railway services introduced in 2004
Named Shinkansen trains